Zablon Davies Amanaka (1 January 1976 – 28 May 2021) was a Kenyan professional footballer who played as a defender.

Club career
After playing in clubs like Kenya Breweries (former name of Tusker FC) and Kenya Pipeline from Nairobi, in 2004 he had a spell in Seychelles League club Saint-Michel United. From January 2005 until January 2006, he played in the Bosnian Premier League's traditionally strongest club, Željezničar from the capital Sarajevo. Then he returned to play in Kenyan Premier League clubs Thika United and AFC Leopards. Since January until June 2007 he was in India in I-League club East Bengal Club. Next, he moved to Seychelles club Anse Réunion FC. In January 2009 he was back to his country playing for Sofapaka, but after six months he signed with another Seychelles club, La Passe FC. At end of 2009 he returned to Kenya and played with Mahakama. He usually played as central defender.

International career
He played regularly for the Kenya national team since 1998, having achieved team captain.

Honours
Saint-Michel United
 Seychelles League: 2003

FK Željezničar
 Premier League of Bosnia and Herzegovina runner-up: 2004-05

East Bengal Club
 Indian Federation Cup: 2007

Anse Réunion FC
 Seychelles League Cup: 2007

References

External sources
 Article on Kangemi Utd. about Amanaka and other Kenyan players

1976 births
2021 deaths
Kenyan footballers
Association football defenders
Tusker F.C. players
FK Željezničar Sarajevo players
Thika United F.C. players
A.F.C. Leopards players
East Bengal Club players
Anse Réunion FC players
Sofapaka F.C. players
La Passe FC players
Mahakama F.C. players
Kenya international footballers
Kenyan expatriate footballers
Kenyan expatriate sportspeople in Bosnia and Herzegovina
Kenyan expatriate sportspeople in India
Kenyan expatriate sportspeople in Seychelles
Expatriate footballers in Bosnia and Herzegovina
Expatriate footballers in India
Expatriate footballers in Seychelles